The Journeyman World Tour was a -year concert tour by English musician Eric Clapton that began on July 6, 1989, in The Hague and concluded on March 9, 1991, in London. The tour was Clapton's first tour following the release of his 1989 studio album Journeyman. The guitarist played a total of 165 shows throughout Europe, North America, Asia, South America and Africa.

Setlist
This set list is representative of the tour's average setlist as conducted by Setlist.fm, which represents all concerts for the duration of the tour.

 "Pretending"
 "Running on Faith"
 "No Alibis"
 "I Shot the Sheriff"
 "White Room"
 "Can't Find My Way Home"
 "Bad Love"
 "Before You Accuse Me"
 "Old Love"
 "Badge"
 "Wonderful Tonight"
 "Cocaine"
 "Layla"
 "Cross Road Blues"
 "Sunshine of Your Love"

Personnel
Eric Clapton–guitar, lead vocals
Alan Clark–keyboards (U.S. and Europe only)
Ray Cooper–percussion, shouted vocal during Sunshine of Your Love percussion solo
Nathan East–bass guitar, vocals
Steve Ferrone–drums
Katie Kissoon–backing vocals
Tessa Niles–backing vocals
Phil Palmer–guitar
Greg Phillinganes–keyboards, vocals
Chuck Leavell–keyboards (1991 Ireland and U.K. dates)

Tour dates

Reception
LGN music critics liked the world tour and especially recognised Eric Clapton's guitar tone throughout the whole Journeyman World Tour, stating: "this period saw a resurrection of Clapton going back to basics. The tones he captured during this era are really amazing. [...] Eric was mainly using a Soldano SLO-100 amp head giving him a very saturated blues tone". Fellow guitar slinger Joe Bonamassa recalled a great Journeyman show, he saw as a teenager and also liked the way Eric Clapton made things sound at the time, calling Eric Clapton's Journeyman tone "one of the best tones Clapton has ever had".

References

Eric Clapton
1990 concert tours
1991 concert tours